Cotton Queen, also known as Crying Out Loud, is a 1937 British comedy film directed by Bernard Vorhaus, and starring Stanley Holloway, Will Fyffe, and Mary Lawson.

Production
The film was directed by Vorhaus at Elstree Studios for the independent producer Joe Rock. Its Lancashire setting was an attempt to capitalise on the popularity of the George Formby series of films.

Cotton Queen was the final film Vorhaus made in Britain. Following the collapse of Julius Hagen's Twickenham Studios, where he had directed most of his films during the previous few years, he returned to the United States.

Cast
 Will Fyffe as Bob Todcastle
 Stanley Holloway as Sam Owen
 Mary Lawson as Joan
 Helen Haye as Margaret Owen
 Marcelle Rogez as Zita de la Rue
 C. Denier Warren as Joseph Cotter
 Syd Courtenay as Mayor
 Gibson Gowland as Jailer

References

Bibliography
 Richards, Jeffrey (ed.). The Unknown 1930s: An Alternative History of the British Cinema, 1929- 1939. I.B. Tauris & Co, 1998.

External links

British comedy films
1937 films
1937 comedy films
1930s English-language films
Films directed by Bernard Vorhaus
Films set in Blackpool
Films shot at Rock Studios
British black-and-white films
Films shot in Greater Manchester
1930s British films